Jay Jay Johnson with Clifford Brown (aka Jay Jay Johnson aka Jay Jay Johnson with Clifford Brown, Jimmy Heath, John Lewis, Percy Heath, Kenny Clarke aka Jay Jay Johnson Sextet) is a 1953 Blue Note Records album by American jazz trombonist J. J. Johnson, recorded on June 22, 1953.  The album was re-issued on CD in 1989 as The Eminent Jay Jay Johnson, Volume 1, with three alternate take 'bonus tacks' from the same 1953 recording session.  Five of the six original tracks were included also in a 1955 12 inch LP re-issue/compilation (also) titled, The Eminent Jay Jay Johnson, Volume 1.

Reception

The Penguin Guide to Jazz stated the recording is, "one of the central documents of post-war jazz."  Scott Yanow (Allmusic) commented that, "Although Johnson has a couple of features, Clifford Brown largely steals the show".

Track listing
LP Side 'A'
"Get Happy" (Harold Arlen, Ted Koehler) - 4:47
"Lover Man" (Jimmy Davis, Roger ("Ram") Ramirez, James Sherman) - 3:50
"Capri" (Gigi Gryce) - 3:37
LP Side 'B'
"Sketch 1" (John Lewis) - 4:21
"Turnpike" (J. J. Johnson) - 4:15
"It Could Happen To You" (Johnny Burke, Jimmy Van Heusen) - 4:42
3 alternate take bonus tracks added to 1989+ CD re-issues, The Eminent Jay Jay Johnson, Volume 1
"Capri" (Gryce) [alternate take] - 3:47
"Turnpike" (Johnson) [alternate take] - 4:10
"Get Happy" (Arlen, Koehler) [alternate take] - 4:11

Personnel
J.J. Johnson – trombone
Clifford Brown – trumpet (except "It Could Happen To You")
Jimmy Heath – tenor saxophone, baritone saxophone (except "It Could Happen To You")
John Lewis – piano
Percy Heath – bass
Kenny Clarke – drums

References

Blue Note Records BLP 5028 (1953)
Blue Note Records BLP 1505 / BST 81505 (1955)
Blue Note Records CDP 7 81505 2 (1989 / 1997)
Blue Note Records UPC 724353214326 (2001)

Blue Note Records albums
J. J. Johnson albums
1953 albums